Clove Brook is a  tributary of Papakating Creek in Sussex County, New Jersey in the United States.

Clove Brook, previously known as Bastions Brook, Clove Creek, Clove River, and Deep Clove River, rises from north of Colesville and travels in a southeasterly direction, predominantly on the north side of State Route 23, down through the Clove Valley toward Sussex Borough. The brook enters the north end of Clove Acres Lake, passes over the dam, and proceeds through the center of the Borough of Sussex.  Leaving the borough, the brook turns south and joins Papakating Creek just north of Lewisburg.  The name Bastions Brook was noted as a part of the description of a parcel of land in a deed signed by Peter Decker in the eighteenth century.

See also
List of rivers of New Jersey
West Branch Papakating Creek
Neepaulakating Creek

References

Rivers of New Jersey
Rivers of Sussex County, New Jersey
Tributaries of the Wallkill River
Papakating Creek watershed